Cohesin subunit SA-2 (SA2) is a protein that in humans is encoded by the STAG2 gene. SA2 is a subunit of the Cohesin complex which mediates sister chromatid cohesion, homologous recombination and DNA looping. In somatic cells cohesin is formed of SMC3, SMC1, RAD21 and either SA1 or SA2 whereas in meiosis, cohesin is formed of SMC3, SMC1B, REC8 and SA3.

STAG2 is frequently mutated in a range of cancers  and several other disorders.

Function 

SA2 is part of the cohesin complex, which is a structure that holds the sister chromatids together after DNA replication.  STAG2 has been shown to interact with STAG1.

Role in Disease 
Of the cohesin complex, STAG2 is the subunit where the most variants have been reported in cancer.  This is thought to be because this gene is located in the X chromosome, therefore only one mutation is needed to inactivate it.

References